J2K-Codec is a commercial library to decode JPEG 2000 images. Version 2.0 was released on 12 April 2011.

J2K-Codec supports decoding of different resolution levels and selective tile decoding. It also supports files, produced by ADV202/ADV212 hardware chips.

The library is faster than JasPer or OpenJPEG libraries and has approximately the same decoding speed as Kakadu
.

See also 
 OpenJPEG
 JasPer
 Kakadu library

References

External links
 J2K-Codec homepage

C (programming language) libraries
Graphics libraries